Carla Voltolina, later Carla Pertini (14 June 1921 – 6 December 2005), was a journalist, Italian partisan, and psychotherapist. She undertook investigations into prostitution in Italy and provided therapy at hospitals and addiction-treatment clinics across Italy.

As spouse of Sandro Pertini, she was the Companion of the President of the Italian Republic from 1978 to 1985.

Biography

Carla Voltolina was the daughter of Luigi, an official of the Italian army from Chioggia, and Rosa Barberis, from Piovà Massaia. She had two sisters, Laura and Luisa, and one brother, Umberto, who was born in 1940. When Voltolina was six, her father signed her up for swimming and she won several trophies by competing with the youth division of Juventus. She became a political science student at the Università di Torino but had to leave the course due to the outbreak of World War II.

After September 8, 1943, Voltolina joined the Italian resistance movement as a courier (known as staffette) for the Matteotti groups, first in Turin and then in  Marche. Arrested by the SS during an operation, she escaped thanks to the help of a doctor. In German-occupied Rome, she  collaborated with the secret, socialist press of Eugenio Colorni. After the Liberation of Rome, she remained committed to the Italian Resistance and transferred to the still-occupied north of Italy. During that time, she met Sandro Pertini, who had come to the region as a representative of the Comitato di Liberazione Nazionale. Pertini was already well known for his imprisonment and exile from Fascist Italy. They met in Milan, on the way to Modena, in the house of the lawyer Arialdo Banfi. They lived together for two years, and on June 8, 1946, they received a civil marriage in the new Repubblica Italiana.

They went to live in Rome in an apartment given to them by Leonida Repaci. Afterwards, they moved to an apartment in the EUR neighborhood in a group of houses build for deputies. When Pertini became president of the Camera, they moved to Montecitorio, and they eventually moved to an attic apartment only 35 meters from the Trevi Fountain in via della Stamperia.

Immediately after the marriage, Voltolina began her journalistic work. With the socialist senator Lina Merlin, Voltolina began an investigation into prostitution in Italy, which produced the book Lettere dalle case chiuse (Voltolina wrote under the pseudonym "Carla Barberis") and contributed to the closure of Italian brothels.

Her journalistic career, which focused on investigations and parliamentary reports, was interrupted when Pertini was elected President of the Chamber of Deputies in 1968. It was no longer considered ethical for her to compose parliamentary reports given the new role of her husband, so Voltolina stopped her journalism. Citing her husband's role, she even refused the presidency of the Italian Red Cross, saying:

So, at 51 years of age, Voltolina decided to resume her university studies that had been interrupted by the war. She received high honors in political science from the Istituto "Cesare Alfieri" di Firenze, with a thesis on homes for the elderly. Five years later, she received a second degree in social sciences with a specialization in psychology from the Università di Torino, after researching the labor conditions of factory workers.

Voltolina was active in the Servizio farmacodipendenza e alcolismo at the Policlinico Gemelli of Rome, the Monteverde hospital, and the diagnostic and psychiatric services of Santa Maria Nuova in Florence. There she also served as a volunteer psychotherapist, an activity she also performed in Prato, Tuscany, and for which she was honored with the keys to the city in 1999.

She was subscribed to the military district of Rome as a "decorated combatant with the Croce di guerra" for her assignment in the Resistance. On September 23, 2002, she founded the Florentine Fondazione Sandro Pertini. From the day of her husband's death in 1990, she decided to be called Carla Pertini, which she had previously always refused, preferring to use the name she was born with.

In 2003, she donated her husband's 1962 Fiat 500 to the Museo dell'automobile di Torino.

Voltolina died on December 6, 2005. Her last wish was to be cremated, and her ashes were buried alongside the tomb of Pertini, in the cemetery of Stella.

Controversies

Visit by the Pope
A short Il Secolo XIX article on July 17, 1990, reported that, while recovering at Policlinico Umberto I in Rome, Sandro Pertini had requested that before he died to see his friend Pope John Paul II and that Pertini's friends and family, including Voltolina, had discouraged the visit. The circumstances were confirmed 17 years later by Arturo Mari, a photographer of L'Osservatore Romano.

Voltolina categorically denied the accusations. The vice president of the Fondazione Pertini, Piero Pierri, said that Voltolina was never opposed to the friendship between her husband and the Pope. Pierri blamed the confusion on an episode of March 23, 1987, after the funeral of general Licio Giorgieri. Pertini fell ill and was recovering in the Roman clinic but was not able to receive a Papal visit due to a medical prohibition.

Biographical film on Pertini
The film was made to celebrate Pertini, who had died three years before. The role of Pertini had been entrusted to Maurizio Crozza, while Carla Signoris played Matilde Ferrari, the young fiancé who remained at home while Pertini fled to France and waited for 18 years before giving him up. The film was broadcast only once on Rai 3 on May 31, 2003, to  viewers:

Afterwards, a media campaign by Il Secolo XIX secured the permission of Rai director , and the film was recovered. It was transmissed on the digital channel Rai Storia on February 24, 2010, on the twentieth anniversary of Sandro Pertini's death.

Legacy

Carla Voltolina collected the materials on her and her husband that created the Fondazione Pertini, of which she was president between 1995 and 2002. The archive is divided into four sections:
 the condolence messages received by Voltolina after Pertini's death; 
 a collection of commemorative documentation on the inauguration of the Pertini museum in Savona and the 600 volumes they donated to the Università degli Studi di Siena, as well as the commemorative stamps, notes, and initiatives of students in 1999 to 2000; 
 the private correspondence and a collection of personal documents on the elderly, women, drugs, Sigmund Freud and other materials Voltolina collected in her studies of psychology from 1955 to 1995; and
 Voltolina's correspondence as president of the Fondazione Pertini.

The archive was then donated to the Fondazione di studi storici Filippo Turati in Florence (part of the Ministry of Cultural Heritage and Activities and Tourism archival system) on February 27, 2015.

Awards

References

Bibliography

External links 

 

Spouses of Italian presidents
University of Florence alumni
Recipients of the War Cross for Military Valor
Italian partisans
1921 births
2005 deaths
20th-century Italian women
20th-century Italian women politicians